Chaharshanbeh Suri or Charshanbeh Suri, is an Iranian festival of the fire dance celebrated on the eve of the last Wednesday of the year, of ancient Zoroastrian origin. It is the first festivity of Nowruz, the Iranian New Year.

Etymology 
Since fire plays a fundamental role in this event, the latter meaning ("scarlet") is more likely. The importance of fire is evident in the stone inscriptions of the Achaemenid kings, and the very first mantra of the Rig Veda is in praise of fire. Chaharshanbe Suri and Holi share roots in ancient Aryan religions.

Observances

Jumping over the fire 

People collect brushwood in an open, unrestricted outdoor area prior to the festival's commencement. At sunset, after making one or more bonfires, they jump over the flames, singing , literally meaning "[let] your redness [be] mine, my paleness yours", or a local equivalent of it. This is considered a purification practice.

Spoon-banging 
Charshanbe Suri includes a custom similar to trick-or-treating that is called , literally translated as "spoon-banging". It is observed by people wearing disguises and going door-to-door to hit spoons against plates or bowls and receive packaged snacks.

Smashing the pot 
Smashing the pot (kūza-šekanī) is one of the more fun activities of Chaharshanbe Suri. In most towns, pots are smashed after the jumping over fire; this custom is evidently rooted in the superstitious belief that smashing a pot transfers misfortune from the people of the house to the pot. There are slight variations in different regions. In Tehran one or more coins are put into a new jug, which is then dropped from the roof to the street below. Until the early years of the Pahlavi period many Tehranis liked to go to the gallery of the Naqqāra-ḵāna, where drummers used to perform at certain hours, and drop their jugs from there. In Khorasan a lump of charcoal symbolizing bad luck, salt to ward off the evil eye, and coins for charity are put into the pot before it is smashed; then each member of the family swings the pot around his or her head so that any misfortune due in the coming year may be transferred to the pot. Finally, the pot is thrown from the roof into the street. In eastern and southeastern Iran a useless old pot is usually chosen, rather than a new one. In Arāk and the Āštīān district grains of barley are put into the pot.

Fortune telling (fāl)  
Another popular practice on Chaharshanbe Suri is fortune telling from a jug (fāl-e kūza, fāl-e bolūnī), usually one with a wide mouth (bolūnī). Everyone present puts an ornament—a ring, bracelet, an earring—that he or she has been wearing into the jug. Then slips of paper inscribed with verses or sentences containing auguries—the number of slips must equal the number of people present—are put into the jug. A young child is assigned to reach into the jug and pull out one piece of paper and give it to the most learned or literate man in the party. Then the child pulls one of the ornaments from the jug. The man reads aloud the verse on the piece of paper, and the owner of the ornament learns from it what his or her fortune will be. In many places, including Isfahan and towns in central Iran, it is customary to take the fortunes from a copy of the dīvān of Ḥāfeẓ, rather than from pieces of paper. The reader chooses a verse at random as the fortune for the owner of the object taken from the pot. At Isfahan a small mirror and a box of collyrium, which supposedly bring good luck, are added to the ornaments in the jug (for similar customs connected with the first evening of winter, Šab-e Čella, see Enjavī, e.g., I, pp. 26, 126; II, p. 165).

Burning rue (esfand) 
Burning rue seeds or frankincense (kondor) at parties on the eve of Chaharshanbe Suri is a widespread practice in most regions of Persia, being considered a necessary precaution against the evil eye and malevolent spirits, devils, and genies (cf. above on fumigation to avoid the evil eye). While rue and a small amount of salt are thrown on the fire the people recite rhymes, which, though varying with the local dialects, usually go something like this: “Rue shrubs and rue seeds (esfandūne, i.e., esfand-dāna), rue shrubs with thirty-three seeds (dūne), rue shrubs know themselves; let them blast (be-tarkūne, i.e., be-tarakānad) the jealous eye” (or “the evil eye”).

Dropping the sash (šāl-andāzī) 
On the eve of Chaharshanbe Suri (and also on Šab-e Čella, see, e.g., Enjavī, I, p. 25) a young man who wishes to know his chances with a particular girl fastens a rope, a sash, or a long piece of cloth to a basket and, accompanied by a member of his family, drops it through an opening or chimney of the girl’s home or drapes it from her roof or over the door. Holding one end of the rope, he hides, and when he feels a slight tug he reels in the basket to find what the head of the girl’s family has put in it (or tied to the rope); from this object he can judge whether or not the family looks on him with favor. Sometimes he puts a present for the girl in the basket—an apple, a pomegranate, an egg, or some other village product; if the girl takes his present out of the basket, it is a sign of acceptance. In some villages this ritual is performed merely as a means of fortune telling. It is popular mainly in northern regions of Iran (Azerbaijan, Āstārā, Gīlān, Zanjān, Qazvīn, Sāva, Āštīān).

Wish-granting snacks (Ajeel e Chaharshanbe Suri) 
Persian tradition holds that eating a special mix of sweet and sour nuts and fruit, called Ajeel e Chaharshanbe Suri, on Chaharshanbe Suri makes wishes come true. It is a mixture of nuts and dried fruits, such as pistachios, almonds, chickpeas, and raisins.

Historical background

Ancient origin 
The festival has its origin in ancient Iranian rituals. The ancient Iranians celebrated the festival of Frawardigan, the last five days of the year in honor of the spirits of the dead, which is today referred to as Farvardinegan. They believed that the spirits of the dead would come for reunion. The seven holy immortals were honored, and were bidden a formal ritual farewell at the dawn of the New Year. The festival also coincided with festivals celebrating the creation of fire and humans. By the time of the Sasanian Empire, the festival was divided into two distinct pentads, known as the lesser and the greater . The belief had gradually developed that the "lesser " belonged to the souls of children and those who died without sin, while the "greater " was for all souls.

Qajar Persia 
A custom once in vogue in Tehran was to seek the intercession of the so-called "Pearl Cannon" on the occasion of Chaharshanbe Suri. This heavy gun, which was cast by the foundry-man Ismāil Isfahāni in 1800, under the reign of Fath-Ali Shah of the Qajar dynasty, became the focus of many popular myths. Until the 1920s, it stood in Arg Square, to which the people of Tehran used to flock on the occasion of Charshanbe Suri. Spinsters and childless or unhappy wives climbed up and sat on the barrel or crawled under it, and mothers even made ill-behaved and troublesome children pass under it in the belief that doing so would cure their naughtiness. These customs died out in the 1920s, when the Pearl Cannon was moved to the Army's Officers' Club. There was also another Pearl Cannon in Tabriz. Girls and women used to fasten their dakhils, pieces of a paper or cloth inscribed with wishes and prayers, to its barrel on Charshanbe Suri. In times, the cannon had been used as a sanctuary for political or non-political fugitives to be immune to arrest or to protest from family problems.

Sadegh Hedayat, an Iranian writer of prose fiction and short stories, published a book, in reference to the cannon that criticizes the old beliefs in Iranian folklore. The book also mentions the origin of the Pearl Cannon.

Modern era 

Today, the Pearl Cannon is placed in the opening of Building Number 7 of the Ministry of Foreign Affairs at 30th Tir Avenue. The Ministry of Cultural Heritage, Handicrafts and Tourism is still in talks with the ministry to remove the gun to a museum.

In Stockholm, Sweden, the  annual festival is one of the largest Chaharshanbe Suri concerts and festivals in the world and is broadcast nationally on Sveriges Television and internationally on Manoto.

Food of Chaharshanbe Suri 
Families customarily enjoy snacks during the evening and a supper at night after the end of the festivities. The usual snacks are nuts and dried fruits (ājīl), including salted hazelnuts, pistachios, almonds, prunes, apricots, and raisins. The supper depends on available local ingredients. In Kermān and Shirāz the main dish is usually polow with pasta soup; the longer the pasta strands, the better the chances for a long life for each member of the family. In Māzandarān, Gorgān, Gīlān, and Tehran, sabzī-polow with fish is most often eaten. In Qazvīn and Garmsār sabzī-polow is made with wild herbs from the desert. In Khorasan several kinds of polow (with lentils, pasta, herbs, and vetch) are traditionally served.

Relations to other holidays 
Prior to changes introduced to the Iranian calendar, Chaharshanbe Suri and the Yazidi festival Çarşema Sor overlapped in dates. The two seem connected, although some Yazidi claim that the name Çarşema Sor is a recent one and the festival was celebrated under other names dedicated to the Peacock Angel.

Gallery

See also 
 Fāl-gūsh
 Yaldā Night
 Kupala Night
 Trndez
 Jaanipäev
 Atar
 Easter fire

References

External links 

 

Festivals in Iran
Festivals in Azerbaijan
Festivals in Turkey
Persian words and phrases
Nowruz
March observances
Observances set by the Solar Hijri calendar
Traditions involving fire
Winter events in Iran